Alain Huetz de Lemps is a French geographer and botanist. He is a lecturer at Bordeaux University (Bordeaux, France) and Honoris Causa professor of the University of Valladolid (Valladolid, Spain). He wrote a primary reference work on wine in Castile and León, Vinos y Viñedos de Castilla y León.

He is the author of approximately 20 books and over 100 papers on the subjects of Spain (wine, spirits, fortified wine, botany), wines and spirits in general, sugar cane, and Oceania.

References

20th-century French botanists
French geographers
Living people
Year of birth missing (living people)
21st-century French botanists